Li Chong, was the last Protector General of the Western Regions prior to Eastern Han. One of his official seals with his name written as 李崇之印信 was excavated  in 1928 from Aksu by Huang Wenbi.

Han dynasty generals